In mathematics, a collection or family  of subsets of a topological space  is said to be point-finite if every point of  lies in only finitely many members of 

A metacompact space is a topological space in which every open cover admits a point-finite open refinement. Every locally finite collection of subsets of a topological space is also point-finite. 
A topological space in which every open cover admits a locally finite open refinement is called a paracompact space. Every paracompact space is therefore metacompact.

References

  
  

General topology
Families of sets